Kachkinturay (Qasqın-Turay) is a rural locality (a village) in Bolshekachakovsky Selsoviet, Kaltasinsky District, Bashkortostan, Russia. The population was 259 as of 2010. There are 4 streets.

Geography 
Kachkinturay is located 32 km east of Kaltasy (the district's administrative centre) by road. Staroturayevo is the nearest rural locality.

References 

Rural localities in Kaltasinsky District